Adenovirus genomes are linear, non-segmented double-stranded (ds) DNA molecules that are typically 26-46 Kbp long, containing 23-46 protein-coding genes. The example used for the following description is Human adenovirus E, a mastadenovirus with a 36 Kbp genome containing 38 protein-coding genes. While the precise number and identity of genes varies among adenoviruses, the basic principles of genome organization and the functions of most of the genes described in this article are shared among all adenoviruses.

Transcription units 

The 38 genes in the Human adenovirus E genome are organized in 17 transcription units, each containing 1-8 coding sequences. Alternative splicing during processing of the pre-mRNAs produced by each transcription unit enable multiple different mRNAs to be produced from one transcription unit.

The E1A, E1B, E2A, E2B, E3, and E4 transcription units are successively transcribed early in the viral reproductive cycle. The proteins coded for by genes within these transcription units are mostly involved in regulation of viral transcription, in replication of viral DNA, and in suppression of the host response to infection.

The L1-L5 transcription units are transcribed later in the viral reproductive cycle, and code mostly for proteins that make up components of the viral capsid or are involved in assembly of the capsid. The L1-L5 transcription units are all regulated by the same promoter region and share the same transcription start site. As a result, transcription of all five late transcription units begins at the same point in the viral reproductive cycle.

Transcription of pre-mRNAs beginning at the late promoter is randomly terminated at one of five termination sites, producing a population of transcripts of five different lengths. The pre-mRNAs of any given length are then alternatively spliced to produce 1-4 different mRNAs coding for a corresponding number of proteins.

Protein-coding genes 

The names, locations, and properties of the 38 protein-coding genes in the Human Adenovirus E genome are given in the following table.

The functions of many adenovirus proteins are known:
 Structural proteins include capsid proteins II (hexon), III (penton base), IIIa, IV (fiber), VI, VIII, and IX; and core proteins V, VII, X, and the terminal protein TP.
 Encapsidation proteins IVa2, 52K, and L1, and hexon assembly protein 100K are involved in assembly of viral capsids.
 The L3 protease cleaves viral precursor proteins pTP, pVI, pVII, pVIII, and IIIa to produce the mature viral proteins.
 Control protein E1A activates transcription of a number of viral genes as well as genes of the host cell.
 Control protein E1B 19K suppresses apoptosis by mimicking the action of cellular protein Bcl-2.
 Control protein E1B 55K binds to and inactivates the transcriptional regulator p53, thus blocking transcription of genes normally activated by p53 and contributing to the suppression of apoptosis.
 The three proteins coded for by the E2A and E2B transcription units are all involved in replication of viral DNA. Adenovirus DNA replication begins at each end of the viral DNA, using the TP protein (rather than RNA) as a primer, so the viral DNA polymerase replicates every base of the genome.
 Membrane protein E3 RID-alpha and membrane protein E3 RID-beta performs a variety of molecular functions that contribute to inhibiting apoptosis.
 CR1 beta membrane glycoprotein modulates the host immune response.
 Membrane glycoprotein E3 gp19K inhibits the insertion of class I MHC proteins in the host-cell membrane, thereby preventing T-cell lymphocytes from recognizing that the host cell has been infected by a virus.
 Control protein E3 14.7K protects the virus from host antiviral responses.
 The control proteins of the E4 transcription unit are involved in regulating transcription of viral DNA.

References

Adenoviridae
Genomics
Animal virology